The Chenab River is a major river that flows in India and Pakistan, and is one of the 5 major rivers of the Punjab region. It is formed by the union of two headwaters, Chandra and Bhaga, which rise in the upper Himalayas in the Lahaul region of Himachal Pradesh, India. The Chenab flows through the Jammu region of Jammu and Kashmir, India into the plains of Punjab, Pakistan, before ultimately flowing into the Indus River.

The waters of the Chenab were allocated to Pakistan under the terms of the Indus Waters Treaty. India is allowed non-consumptive uses such as power generation. The Chenab River is extensively used in Pakistan for irrigation. Its waters are also transferred to the channel of the Ravi River via numerous link canals.

Name 
The Chenab river was called  in the Rigveda (VIII.20.25, X.75.5). The name meant that it was seen to have dark-coloured waters. The term Krishana is also found in the Atharvaveda.

In the Mahabharata, the common name of the river was Chandrabhaga because the river is formed from the confluence of the Chandra and the Bhaga rivers. This name was also known to the Ancient Greeks, who Hellenised it in various forms such as Sandrophagos, Sandabaga and Cantabra.

The simplification of Chandrabhaga to 'Chenab', with evident Persianate influence, probably occurred in early medieval times and is witnessed in Alberuni.

Course 

The Bhaga river originates from Surya taal lake, which is situated a few kilometers west of the Bara-lacha la pass in Himachal Pradesh. The Chandra river originates from glaciers east of the same pass (near Chandra Taal). This pass also acts as a water-divide between these two rivers. The Chandra river transverses  while the Bhaga river transverses  through narrow gorges before their confluence at Tandi.

The Chandra-Bhaga then flows through the Chamba district in Himachal Pradesh before entering the Jammu division of Jammu and Kashmir, where it flows through the Kishtwar, Doda, Ramban, Reasi and Jammu districts. It enters Pakistan and flows through the Punjab province before emptying into the Sutlej, forming the Panjnad river.

History 
The river was known to Indians in the Vedic period. In 325 BCE, Alexander the Great allegedly founded the town of Alexandria on the Indus (present day Uch Sharif or Mithankot or Chacharan in Pakistan) at the confluence of the Indus and the combined streams of Punjab rivers (currently known as the Panjnad River).

Dams

The river has rich power generation potential in India. There are many dams built, under construction or proposed to be built on the Chenab for the purpose of hydroelectric power generation in the country, including:

All of these are "run-of-the-river" projects as per the Indus Water Treaty of 1960. The Treaty allocates the waters of Chenab to Pakistan. India can use its water for domestic and agricultural uses or for "non-consumptive" uses such as hydro power.

Pakistan has four headworks on the Chenab:

See also

References

Bibliography

External links
 Chenab River in the context of Pakistan - by Pakistan Tourism Portal

Rivers of Himachal Pradesh
Rigvedic rivers
Rivers of Jammu and Kashmir
Indus basin
Punjab
International rivers of Asia
Rivers of Punjab (Pakistan)
Rivers of India
Rivers in Buddhism
Rivers of Pakistan